The prime minister of the Co-operative Republic of Guyana is an elected member of the National Assembly of Guyana who is the principal assistant and advisor to the president as well as the leader of government business in the Assembly, but is not the head of government in Guyana. The prime minister assumes the office of president if the presidency becomes vacant.

Background
The office of Prime Minister of Guyana was established in 1966 upon Guyana becoming independent. The office is the direct successor to that of the Premier and Chief Minister of British Guiana. In 1964 the last elections in British Guiana was held, and with the next elections slated to occur after independence, the Premier of British Guiana automatically became Prime Minister of Guyana on independence day.

From 1966 to 1980 the prime minister was the head of government, who exercised executive power and general direction and control of the government. During this time the country’s head of state was Elizabeth II (represented by a governor-general) from 1966 to 1970, and then a ceremonial president from 1970 to 1980 after Guyana became a republic.

The 1980 constitution abolished the ceremonial presidency and created an executive president who became head of state and head of government. Under the constitution the prime minister before the commencement of the constitution became the president with full executive powers. The office of Prime Minister was retained and now included the permanent subsidiary office of First Vice-President to further highlight the constitutional role of the prime minister as the president’s successor. However the powers and influence of the office and of individual prime ministers has varied depending on the responsibilities delegated by the president.

Appointment and responsibilities
The prime minister is appointed by the president from among the elected members of the National Assembly of Guyana. As a result of the political structure of the government of Guyana where an election for the members of the National Assembly concurrently serves as an election of the president, the prime minister is always drawn from the party or coalition the president belongs to. Despite it being the practice of almost all political parties or coalitions to designate a presidential and prime ministerial candidate in the event they secure the most votes over any other parties or coalitions in the election, only a presidential candidate is legally required to be designated in advance of the election.

The selection, appointment, and removal of the prime minister is therefore constitutionally at the discretion of the president; however, only a member of the National Assembly who is eligible to become president may be appointed prime minister. This ensures that the requirements for a person to become president is met in case circumstances result in the prime minister having to accede to the office.

Under Article 101 of the Constitution of Guyana, the prime minister is described as the president’s principal assistant in the discharge of the functions of the president. The responsibilities of the prime minister include:
 Serving as Acting President whenever the President is temporarily absent or unable discharge the functions of the office.
 Acceding to the Presidency on the event of the death, removal, or resignation of a President.
 Chairing the meetings of the Cabinet in the absence of the President.
 Serving as the Leader of Government Business in the National Assembly (this is a legislative role and not akin to being Head of Government). 
 Heading the office of the Prime Minister and having oversight of the subordinate agencies of that office.
 Serving as the subject Minister of any additional ministerial portfolios designated by the President.

The Constitution also mandates that the prime minister – being first vice-president – has precedence over any additional vice president(s).

Oath of office
Prior to the appointment of a Prime Minister, the President will issue an ‘Instrument Appointing a Prime Minister’ under the Seal of Guyana which sets out the name of the person to be appointed, and the section of the constitution utilized to make the appointment.

The Prime Minister designate then takes the following oath of office of the form specified in the Schedule to the Constitution of Guyana:

 
The phrase 'so help me God' is not specified in the constitution, but may be added at the end of the oath on the personal discretion of the prime minister. 
 
The oath is then signed by the prime minister and countersigned by the president, after which, the instrument of appointment is handed over to the prime minister.

Symbols of office
There are no distinctive symbols of the office of prime minister as the coat of arms of Guyana is used. The prime minister is one of only two officials in Guyana – the other being the president – who do not use regular vehicle plates. The vehicle containing the prime minister displays a gold image of the coat of arms of Guyana.

List of prime ministers
This is a list of the prime ministers of Guyana, from the establishment of the office of Chief Minister of British Guiana in 1953 to the present day. After the creation of the vice presidency in 1980, the title became the Prime Minister and First Vice President of Guyana.

Chief minister of British Guiana

Premiers of British Guiana

Prime ministers of Guyana

Timeline

See also

 List of prime ministers of Elizabeth II
 List of governors of British Guiana
 List of heads of state of Guyana
 President of Guyana
 Vice President of Guyana
 List of Privy Counsellors (1952–2022)

References

Bibliography

External links
 World Statesmen – Guyana
 Rulers.org – Guyana

 
1966 establishments in Guyana